Victoria Ainslie Pratt (born December 18, 1970) is a Canadian actress, author, and fitness model.

Early life
Pratt grew up in Chesley, Ontario, a self described "tomboy at heart." She attended the kinesiology program at York University in Toronto and graduated summa cum laude. Before starting her acting career, Pratt made a notable mark in the fitness world as a performance tester, working at the York University campus with various athletes including players from the Toronto Maple Leafs and San Jose Sharks, among others.

Career
After graduating from York, Pratt met Robert Kennedy, publisher of MuscleMag, who convinced Pratt to try her hand at modelling and acting. Pratt quickly found success as a fitness model, gracing several magazine covers (including MuscleMag and Oxygen) and working alongside future WWE stars Trish Stratus and Torrie Wilson.

Pratt eventually began to land starring acting roles on television throughout the late 1990s, including Xena: Warrior Princess, Once a Thief, Cleopatra 2525 (which she starred in for two seasons), and Mutant X (which she starred in for three seasons).

Pratt made her film debut in the 1998 film titled Legacy, alongside David Hasselhoff, directed by her future husband, T. J. Scott. Pratt also starred in several independent or small made-for-TV movies during the 1990s and early 2000s.

Pratt has since garnered a small cult following who recognize her large body of work as an actress in cancelled, but popular low-budget science fiction productions. There were several Tumblr fan pages and websites dedicated to Pratt. AskMen called her a "butt-kicking sci-fi queen."

Since the mid-2000s, Pratt has guest-starred on several hit TV series including CSI: Crime Scene Investigation (2009), NCIS (2010), Lie to Me (2011), and Castle (2013). In 2006, Pratt co-starred with model Josie Moran in the film The Mallory Effect which premiered at the Slamdance Film Festival. The same year Pratt starred with Taye Diggs on the ABC television series Day Break (2006), which premiered on November 15, 2006.

Pratt has continued modelling throughout her career, recently being named Oxygen Magazines "Cover Girl" in 2011. As of October 2015, she is a published author of adult fiction, her first book being Double Down.

Personal life
Pratt married director and photographer T. J. Scott in 2000; they divorced in 2016.

She divides her time between Toronto, Los Angeles, Nashville, and New Zealand. Pratt has a blue belt in Shotokan karate and is a keen kickboxer.

In her interview with Oxygen Magazine, Pratt said she enjoyed "salsa dancing, hiking in the Hollywood hills and volleyball."

On October 12, 2019, Pratt married American country singer Trace Adkins in New Orleans, Louisiana. Blake Shelton officiated the wedding.

Filmography

Film

Television

References

External links 

 
 

1970 births
Actresses from Ontario
Female models from Ontario
Canadian film actresses
Canadian television actresses
Canadian women novelists
Living people
People from Bruce County
Sportspeople from Ontario
Writers from Ontario
York University alumni
20th-century Canadian actresses
20th-century Canadian women writers
21st-century Canadian actresses
21st-century Canadian novelists
21st-century Canadian women writers